Ulnowo  is a village in the administrative district of Gmina Susz, within Iława County, Warmian-Masurian Voivodeship, in northern Poland.

The village has a population of 120.

Notable residents
 Hans Adolf Erdmann von Auerswald (1792–1848), politician

References

Villages in Iława County